"Hollywood Bitch" is a song by the American rock band Stone Temple Pilots. It is the second & final single from the group's fifth studio album, Shangri-La Dee Da. The song was written by vocalist Scott Weiland and bassist Robert DeLeo. Dean DeLeo stated in a 2001 interview that the main riff for the song was actually written before their second album, Purple, had been released.

Track listing
"Hollywood Bitch" (Album Version)
"Revolution" (Single Version)
"Bi-Polar Bear" (Album Version)
"Trippin' On a Hole in a Paper Heart" (Live)

Chart positions

External links

References

Stone Temple Pilots songs
2001 singles
Songs written by Robert DeLeo
Songs written by Scott Weiland
Song recordings produced by Brendan O'Brien (record producer)
2001 songs
Atlantic Records singles